Kosmos 129 ( meaning Cosmos 129) or Zenit-2 No.33 was a Soviet, first generation, low resolution, optical film-return reconnaissance satellite launched in 1966.

Kosmos 129 was launched by a Vostok-2 rocket, serial number U1500-05, flying from Site 41/1 at the Plesetsk Cosmodrome. The launch took place at 12:14 GMT on 14 October 1966, and following its successful arrival in orbit the spacecraft received its Kosmos designation; along with the International Designator 1966-091A and the Satellite Catalog Number 02491.

After seven days in orbit, Kosmos 129 was deorbited, with its return capsule descending under parachute, landing at 06:14 GMT on 21 October 1966, and recovered by Soviet force.

References

Kosmos satellites
Spacecraft launched in 1966
Spacecraft which reentered in 1966
Zenit-2 satellites
1966 in the Soviet Union